Willard C. "Woody" Allen (born 1940) was an American politician in the state of Kentucky. He served in the Kentucky House of Representatives as a Republican from 1974 to 2002.

References

Living people
Republican Party members of the Kentucky House of Representatives
1940 births
People from Garrard County, Kentucky